Kirnahar is a village in Nanoor CD block in Bolpur subdivision of Birbhum district in the Indian state of West Bengal.

Geography

Location

Kirnahar is located in the south-eastern corner of the district which is an alluvial plain between Ajay River and Mayurakshi River. It has hot and dry summers, spread over March – May, followed by the monsoon from June to September. 78 per cent of the rainfall occurs during this period.

Administration 
Kirnahar I & II are village panchayats (local self-government) under Nanoor Panchayat Samity of Birbum Zilla Parishad. A police station, since 2022, is located at Kirnahar.

Transport 
Kirnahar railway station is midway station on the 52 km Ahmedpur Katwa Railway. It is well-connected by bus routes with Sainthia, Bolpur, Ahmedpur, Suri, Mallarpur and Rampurhat of this district and also with different places of the adjacent districts of Murshidabad and Burdwan. Three buses also run to Kolkata from this little town at 5:15 am, 6:00 am and 6:10 am.

Education 
Kirnahar has two higher secondary schools. They are:
1. Kirnahar Shib Chandra High School
2. Kirnahar Tarapado Memorial Girls High School.

The first one is one of the oldest schools in Birbhum (Estd. 1895). It was established on the land donated by the local Sarkar zamindar  Pioneere Babu Shib Chand Sarkar.

 His Three sons Satyesh Chandra Sarkar, Sauresh Chandra Sarkar and Saibesh Chandra Sarkar fulfilled his Dream by established Shib chandra High school in 1895.
The school produced many great personalities who made their marks in political, cultural and scientific world. To name a few: Debnath Das (One of the Advisors of Netaji Subhash Chandra Bose and the INA),Pranab Mukherjee (President of India 2012–2017), Mrinal Thakur (Eminent scientist, currently in Auburn University) etc.

There are 7 Govt.-aided primary schools, 5 S.S.K.(Sishu Siksha Kendra), one M.S.K.(Madhyamik Siksha Kendra) and a few private schools in Kirnahar and its surroundings. The Govt.-aided primary schools are:
  Kirnahar Junior Basic School.
  Uttar Kirnahar Primary School.
  Kirnahar Nabin Chandra Smriti Primary School.
  Kirnahar Laxmimata Primary School.
  Parota Primary School.
  Maheshgram Primary School.
  Nimrha Primary School.
  Sankha's School.
  Kirnahar Nimna Buniyadi Vidhyalay (Near Bhadra Kalimata Mandir).
Kirnahar has one government sponsored library - Kirnahar Rabindra Smriti Samity Town Library. The library was established on 17 August 1941 (32nd Shravana, 1348 B.S.) just after ten days of the demise of great poet Rabindranath Tagore. The founder-secretary was Dr.Krishnagopal Chandra. In 1957 it became sponsored by the West Bengal Govt. Satyaranjan Sengupta was the first employed librarian. It was upgraded to a Town Library in 1986. At present (March, 2015), the library possesses over 15,000 books and over 1,400 members.

People from Kirnahar 
 Pranab Mukherjee, Former President of India, was born at Mirati, Kirnahar.

Healthcare
There is a primary health centre at Kirnahar (with 10 beds).

References 

Villages in Birbhum district